In statistics, Wombling is any of a number of techniques used for identifying zones of rapid change, typically in some quantity as it varies across some geographical or Euclidean space.   It is named for statistician William H. Womble.

The technique may be applied to gene frequency in a population of organisms, and to evolution of language.

References
William H. Womble 1951.  "Differential Systematics". Science vol 114, No. 2961, p315–322. 
Fitzpatrick M.C., Preisser E.L., Porter A., Elkinton J., Waller L.A., Carlin B.P. and Ellison A.E. (2010) "Ecological boundary detection using Bayesian areal wombling", Ecology 91:3448–3455  
Liang, S., Banerjee, S. and Carlin, B.P. (2009) "Bayesian Wombling for Spatial Point Processes", Biometrics, 65 (11), 1243–1253 
 Ma, H. and Carlin, B.P. (2007) "Bayesian Multivariate Areal Wombling for Multiple Disease Boundary Analysis", Bayesian Analysis, 2 (2), 281–302
Banerjee, S. and Gelfand, A.E. (2006) "Bayesian Wombling: Curvilinear Gradient Assessment Under Spatial Process Models", Journal of the American Statistical Association, 101(476), 1487–1501. 
Quick, H., Banerjee, S. and Carlin, B.P. (2015). "Bayesian Modeling and Analysis for Gradients in Spatiotemporal Processes" Biometrics, 71, 575–584. 
Quick, H., Banerjee, S. and Carlin, B.P. (2013). "Modeling temporal gradients in regionally aggregated California asthma hospitalization data" Annals of Applied Statistics, 7(1), 154–176. 
Change detection
Spatial analysis